is a Japanese football player currently playing for Kawasaki Frontale.

National team career
On 23 September 2010, Ando was selected for the Japan U-23 national team squad for the 2010 Asian Games held in Guangzhou, China. In July 2012, he was elected Japan for 2012 Summer Olympics. Although he did not play in the match, as he was the team's reserve goalkeeper behind Shuichi Gonda, Japan won the 4th place.

Club statistics
Updated to 22 February 2019.

1Includes Emperor's Cup.
2Includes J. League Cup.
3Includes AFC Champions League.

Honours

Kawasaki Frontale
J1 League (4): 2017, 2018, 2020, 2021

Japan
Asian Games (1) : 2010

References

External links

Profile at Kawasaki Frontale

1990 births
Living people
Association football people from Tokyo
Japanese footballers
J1 League players
Kawasaki Frontale players
Shonan Bellmare players
Olympic footballers of Japan
Footballers at the 2012 Summer Olympics
Asian Games medalists in football
Footballers at the 2010 Asian Games
Asian Games gold medalists for Japan
Association football goalkeepers
Medalists at the 2010 Asian Games